The University Village is a complex of three apartment buildings located in Greenwich Village in the Lower Manhattan-part of New York City.  The complex is owned by New York University and was built in the 1960s as part of the University's transition to a residential college.  One of the towers, 505 LaGuardia Place, is a co-op that does not house students, and the other two towers, Silver Tower I and Silver Tower II, house faculty and graduate students of NYU.  The buildings were designed by modern architects James Ingo Freed and I. M. Pei, and the central-plaza contains a sculpture by Carl Nesjär and Pablo Picasso.  In 2008 the complex was designated a New York City Landmark by the Landmarks Preservation Commission.

History

Construction 
In 1953 the Mayor’s Commission on Slum Clearance designated three superblocks in the Greenwich Village area for redevelopment under Title 1 of the Housing Act of 1949.  The project was known as the Washington Square Southeast redevelopment area, with the northernmost superblock given to NYU for educational purposes and the lower two superblocks to the Washington Square Village Corporation.  The northern superblock eventually became the site of several NYU buildings, including the Bobst Library, Tisch Hall of the Stern School of Business, and Warren Weaver Hall.  However, poor sales of apartments in the central superblock's Washington Square Village buildings led the Corporation to sell the southernmost superblock to NYU in 1960.  As part of the sale, NYU was required to develop 175 units of low-income housing on the site.

In 1960 NYU hired I. M. Pei & Associates, later known as Pei Cobb Freed & Partners, to design the complex.  While I. M. Pei contributed to the design process, the primary architect for the site was James Ingo Freed.  This was part of a program the University had started in the 1950s to transform itself from a commuter college spread out over the entire city to a residential college centered in the Washington Square area of Greenwich Village.  Originally the site was to include a low-rise apartment building.  However Pei requested the plan be altered to include only the tall towers to prevent the site from being visually overwhelmed by the buildings.  With the finalized plan of three 30 story towers approved by the city, construction began in September 1964 and was completed in October 1966.  The tower at 505 LaGuardia Place would become a co-op under the Mitchell-Lama program to fulfill the requirement for low-income housing, while the towers at 100 and 110 Bleecker Street would become apartments for University faculty and graduate students.

Later years 
In 1974 the two towers housing University faculty and graduate students were renamed for Julius Silver, an NYU alumnus who would later bequeath $150 million to the University.  In 1981 the University constructed the one-story Coles Sports & Recreation Center, designed by Wank Adams Slavin Associates, on the eastern part of the superblock.  This was an alteration of the original site plan, which would have included an experimental elementary school run by NYU on the eastern part of the superblock.

In 2003 the Greenwich Village Society for Historic Preservation requested that the New York City Landmarks Preservation Commission designate the entire superblock as a historic landmark.
  This would have included the three towers, the central courtyard, a Morton Williams supermarket on the site since 1961 that NYU purchased in 2000, and the Coles Sports & Recreation Center.  In 2008 the Commission completed hearings on the request and designated the three towers and the central courtyard as a Historic Landmark.
  This effectively ended NYU's plan of adding a fourth 40-story tower to the site as part of its NYU 2031 plan, as the smaller area designated as a landmark covered the possible locations of any new building.

In July 2012, the New York City Council voted approval of the “NYU 2031” plan for university expansion, which called for construction of two new buildings on the Silver Towers superblock, and two more on the Washington Square Village superblock, for a total of 1.9 million square feet of new residential, academic, office and other space. A coalition of opponents, led by NYU Faculty Against the Sexton Plan and the Greenwich Village Society for Historic Preservation, fought the plan for several years — both before and after City Council approval — culminating in a legal challenge filed in September 2012. In January 2014, New York State Supreme Court Justice Donna Mills blocked much of the plan. Opponents declared victory, but NYU appealed the decision.

Structure
The complex consists of three thirty-story cast-in-place concrete towers arranged in a pinwheel plan around a  courtyard.  Together the three brutalist towers have 535 apartments, broken up into one-, two- and three-bedroom units.  All of the doors and windows are made of duranodic aluminum, with the windows deeply recessed into the load-bearing grids of four and eight bays on alternating sides of each tower.  The concrete around the entrances was bush-hammered to partially expose the aggregate base of the concrete.  Also part of the complex is a circular concrete sitting area on the southeast section of the site that was part of the original plan and a playground south of the sitting area that was designed by the original architect in 1967.

Artwork 
In the courtyard at the center of the complex is a  cubistic sculpture known as the Bust of Sylvette.  As its name indicates, it is a sculpture in-the-round of the head, neck, and shoulders of a woman named Sylvette David.  It was created by the Norwegian artist Carl Nesjär in 1968 and was done in collaboration with Pablo Picasso, who had created a  version of the sculpture in folded metal, in 1954.  Picasso was living in the south of France when he met the 20-year-old Sylvette through her boyfriend, Toby Jellinek .  Picasso was captivated by her blonde hair and face, and she would become the subject for over 40 pieces of artwork he produced during 1954.  The sculpture is noted for its use of the betograve technique of sandblasting concrete to create different textures and received a New York State Award from the New York State Council on the Arts in 1969.  A further plan by Christo and Jeanne-Claude in 1972 to wrap the sculpture in brown fabric was never completed.

Awards and honors
 1996 – Robert A. M. Stern's List of 35 Modern Landmarks-in-Waiting
 1969 – New York chapter of the AIA Environments Awards Exhibition: Street Lighting Award
 1967 – American Institute of Architects: National Honor Award
 1967 – City Club of New York: Albert S. Bard Award
 1966 – Concrete Industry Board Award
 1966 – Fortune: Ten Buildings That Climax an Era

References
Notes

External links
 

Brutalist architecture in New York City
Buildings and structures completed in 1966
Greenwich Village
I. M. Pei buildings
James Ingo Freed buildings
New York City Designated Landmarks in Manhattan
New York University
Residential skyscrapers in Manhattan